Puerta de la Ciudadela (Gateway of the Citadel), is one of the few remaining parts of the wall that surrounded the oldest part of the city of Montevideo, the citadel, which was torn down in 1829. It is located by Plaza Independencia, in Ciudad Vieja.

External links
Puerta de la Ciudadela - IMM

References

Buildings and structures in Montevideo
Ciudad Vieja, Montevideo